John Randolph (1727 – January 31, 1784) was an American lawyer and politician from Williamsburg in the British colony of Virginia. He served as king's attorney for Virginia from 1766 until he left for Britain at the outset of the American Revolution.

Early life
Randolph was born in Williamsburg into one of the most prominent families of Virginia. His father was Sir John Randolph, the only colonial Virginian to be knighted. The younger Randolph was a close friend of Thomas Jefferson, his cousin, with whom he often played violin.

Revolution
During the revolutionary crisis, Randolph remained a Loyalist, unlike his brother Peyton Randolph, and his son, Edmund Randolph. In 1774, he wrote "Considerations on the Present State of Virginia", in which he called for reconciliation between his fellow colonists and Great Britain.

He boycotted the Virginia Convention, an extralegal convening of the House of Burgesses headed by his brother Peyton. When hostilities began, Randolph fled to Scotland with Governor Dunmore. In Scotland, Randolph continued to promote reconciliation between Great Britain and the colonies.

Personal life

On July 26, 1750, he married Ariana Jennings (–1808) in Annapolis, Maryland. Together, they had three children.

 Edmund Jennings Randolph (1753–1813), who married Elizabeth Nicholas (1753–1810), daughter of Robert Carter Nicholas Sr.
 Susanna Beverly Randolph (1755–1791), who married John Randolph Grymes (1745–1805).
 Ariana Jennings Randolph (1760–1794), who married James Wormeley (1746–1830).

When Randolph died in Brompton, London, in 1784, his last request was to be buried in Virginia. His remains were returned and he is interred in the chapel at The College of William and Mary in Williamsburg. His son Edmund became Governor of Virginia, the first Attorney General of the United States, and the second US Secretary of State.

Descendants

His grandson, John Randolph Grymes (1786–1854), was a New Orleans attorney, member of the Louisiana state legislature, U. S. attorney for Louisiana district, and aide-de-camp to General Andrew Jackson during the Battle of New Orleans.

His great-granddaughters through his grandson, Ralph Randolph Wormeley (1785–1852), included Elizabeth Wormeley Latimer (1822–1904), and Ariana Randolph Wormeley (1833–1922), was married to Daniel Sargent Curtis (1825–1908), a lawyer and banker and Trustee of the Boston Public Library, director of the Boston National Bank and owner of Palazzo Barbaro.

Ancestry

References

Crompton, Samuel Willard. "Randolph, John". American National Biography Online, February 2000.

External links

1727 births
1784 deaths
Loyalists in the American Revolution from Virginia
American people of English descent
Burials at the College of William & Mary
Mayors of Williamsburg, Virginia
John
Virginia lawyers